The marginal mandibular branch of the facial nerve passes forward beneath the platysma and depressor anguli oris, supplying the muscles of the lower lip and chin, and communicating with the mental branch of the inferior alveolar nerve.

Muscles innervated
The marginal mandibular branch innervates the following muscles:
 depressor labii inferioris muscle - lowers bottom lip down and laterally. Origin: Anterior part of oblique line of mandible. Insertion: Lower lip at midline, blends with muscle from opposite side.
 depressor anguli oris muscle (triangularis) - lowers the corner of the mouth down and laterally. Origin: Oblique line of mandible below canine, premolar, and first molar teeth. Insertion: Skin at the corner of mouth and blending with orbicularis oris.
 mentalis muscle - raises and protrudes lower lip as it wrinkles skin on chin. Origin: Mandible inferior to incisor teeth. Insertion: Skin of chin.

Clinical significance
The marginal mandibular nerve may be injured during surgery in the neck region, especially during excision of the submandibular salivary gland or during neck dissections due to lack of accurate knowledge of variations in the course, branches and relations. An injury to this nerve during a surgical procedure can distort the expression of the smile as well as other facial expressions. The marginal mandibular branch of the facial nerve is found superficial to the facial artery and (anterior) facial vein. Thus the facial artery can be used as an important landmark in locating the marginal mandibular nerve during surgical procedures. Damage can cause paralysis of the three muscles it supplies, which can cause an asymmetrical smile due to lack of contraction of the depressor labii inferioris muscle. This may be corrected with resection of the muscle, which tends to be successful.

Additional images

References

External links
  - "Branches of Facial Nerve (CN VII)"
 
 
 http://www.dartmouth.edu/~humananatomy/figures/chapter_47/47-5.HTM

Facial nerve